Servet Libohova was an Albanian politician and mayor of Tirana from 1915 through 1916.

References

Year of birth missing
Year of death missing
Mayors of Tirana